The boys' singles tournament of the 2015 Badminton Asia Junior Championships was held from July 1 to 5. The defending champions of the last edition was Shi Yuqi from China. Firman Abdul Kholik, Cheam June Wei and Kantawat Leelavechabutr were the top 3 seeded this year. Lin Guipu of China emerged as the champion after beat Seo Seung-jae of South Korea in the finals with the score 21–16, 21–11.

Seeded

  Firman Abdul Kholik (quarter Finals)
  Cheam June Wei (fourth round)
  Kantawat Leelavechabutr (quarter Finals)
  Seo Seung-jae (final)
  Kantaphon Wangcharoen (quarter Finals)
  Lin Guipu (champion)
  Lu Chia-hung (semi Finals)
  Satheishtharan Ramachandran (third round)
  Vega Vio Nirwanda (quarter Finals)
  Loh Kean Yew (fourth round)
  Lee Jun-su (third round)
  Panji Ahmad Maulana (fourth round)
  Ryan Ng Zin Rei (third round)
  Kittipong Imnark (second round)
  Enzi Shafira (second round)
  Ansal Yadav (third round)

Draw

Finals

Top half

Section 1

Section 2

Section 3

Section 4

Bottom half

Section 5

Section 6

Section 7

Section 8

References

External links 
Main Draw

2015 Badminton Asia Junior Championships